Carla Killough McClafferty (born July 11, 1958), is an American author of non-fiction for children, writing mostly about science and history.  The International Reading Association awarded the 2007 Children's Book Award for Intermediate Nonfiction to her book Something Out of Nothing: Marie Curie and Radium. The National Council of Teachers of English gave a 2008 Orbis Pictus Recommended book designation to In Defiance of Hitler: The Secret Mission of Varian Fry.

Personal life
McClafferty was born, raised, and still lives in Arkansas.  She grew up on her parents' rice and soybean farm in the tiny Lonoke County community of Tomberlin.  About attending England Elementary School she says, "We didn't even have a library; instead, a shelf filled with books stretched across the side of the room beneath the windows."

She has three children, Ryan, Brittney, and Corey McClafferty.  In 1988, her son Corey, at the age of fourteen months, fell from the backyard swing and died from a head injury.  This tragedy led to her first book, Forgiving God. Since then, she has researched and written four non-fiction books for young readers.

Career
Before becoming a writer, McClafferty worked as a Registered Radiologic Technologist.  McClafferty coined the phrase Biography Plus to describe her books, which means her heavily researched biographies also include information that deepens the reader's understanding of the topic.  For example in her latest book, The Many Faces of George Washington: Remaking a Presidential Icon, biography material about Washington is enhanced by a recent investigation at Mount Vernon to determine what George Washington really looked like at three pivotal moments in his life.

In addition to being the author of literary nonfiction books, Carla Killough McClafferty is also an experienced public speaker for audiences of all ages at a various local, national and international venues.  She served as Regional Advisor for the Society of Children's Book Writers and Illustrators (SCBWI) Arkansas branch for three years.

Bibliography

Forgiving God
About her struggle with faith following the death of her son. (Discovery House Publishers 1995)

Awards and recommendations:
Doubleday Crossings Book Club Selection

The Head Bone's Connected to the Neck Bone: The Weird, Wacky and Wonderful X-ray
A history of the x-ray from Wilhelm Röntgen to the present day. (Farrar, Straus and Giroux 2001)

Awards and recommendations:
National Science Teachers Association / Children's Book Council, Outstanding Science Trade Book
New York Public Library, List for the Teen Age
Society of School Librarians International, Honor Book
Junior Library Guild Selection
Society of Children's Writers and Illustrators, Work-in-Progress Grant winner

Something Out of Nothing: Marie Curie and Radium
The life of Marie Curie and the story of the use and misuse of radium. (Farrar, Straus and Giroux 2006). See Author interview at http://cynthialeitichsmith.blogspot.com/2008/04/author-interview-carla-killough.html

Awards and recommendations:
International Reading Association, Children's Book Award Winner, intermediate nonfiction
National Council of Teachers of English, Orbis Pictus Honor Book
American Library Association, Best Books for Young Adult List
American Library Association, Amelia Bloomer Project List
National Science Teachers Association, Outstanding Science Trade Book
National Council for the Social Studies / Children's Book Council, Notable Social Studies Trade Book for Young People
New York Public Library, Books for the Teen Age List
Booklist Top Ten Sci-Tech books
Junior Library Guild Selection
Starred review in School Library Journal
Charlie May Simon Reading List

In Defiance of Hitler: The Secret Mission of Varian Fry
The story of American journalist Varian Fry who helped many refugees flee from France during World War II. (Farrar, Straus and Giroux 2008). Also available as an audio book.

Awards and recommendations:
National Council Teachers of English, Orbis Pictus Recommended book
Cooperative Children's Book Council, Choices List
Society of School Librarians International, Honor Book
Starred reviews in Booklist and Jewish Book World

The Many Faces of George Washington: Remaking a Presidential Icon
An attempt to work out what George Washington really looked like when his portraits show such variation. (Carolrhoda Books, 2011)

Tech Titans
Computer geeks who changed the world! This book contains the biographies of six men who have changed the way we work, play and socialize by making computers part of our daily lives. (Scholastic, 2011)

Awards and recommendations:
Junior Library Guild Selection
Starred review in School Library Journal
Starred review in BCCB
ALA notables list
SLJ Best Books of 2011 list
Moonbeam Children's Book Award silver medal winner
Society of School Librarians 2011 Honor Book
BCCB Guide Book to Gift Books.

References

External links
 Carla Killough McClafferty Official Website

1958 births
People from Lonoke County, Arkansas
Writers from Arkansas
Living people